Arab Academy of Damascus is the oldest academy regulating the Arabic language, established in 1918 during the reign of Faisal I of Syria. It is based in al-Adiliyah Madrasa and is modeled on the language academies of Europe and founded with the explicit reference to the example of the Académie française.

Arabization was the major mission of this academy after long period of Ottoman domination and use of Ottoman Turkish in major parts of the Arab world. Since establishing, it has been operated by notable committees of Arabic language professors, scholars and experts could re-spread the use of Arabic in the state's institutions and daily life of many Arab countries by adapting widely accepted proceedings and records for Arabization.

Directors of this academy were as the following: 
 Muhammad Kurd Ali (1919–1953)
 Khalil Mardam Bey (1953–1959)
 Prince Mustafa Shahabi (1959–1968)
 Dr. Husni Sabh (1968–1986)
 Dr. Shaker Al-Fahham (1986–2008)
 Dr. Marwan Mahasne (2008–current)

As of 2011, its library contains some 15,000 volumes and 500 manuscripts.

Resources
Arab Academy of Damascus, From Answers
Versteegh, Kees. The Arabic Language. New York: Edinburgh UP, 2001. Print. Page 178.
Rachad Hamzaoui, L’Académie Arabe de Damas et le problème de la modernisation de la langue arabe, Leiden: Brill, 1965.

References

External links
Arab Academy of Damascus

Arabic language regulators
Language regulators
Education in Damascus
1918 establishments in Mandatory Syria